Shyama Prasad Mukherjee is an Indian doctor. In 2019, he has been awarded Padma Shri by the Indian Government for his contribution in medicine.

Early life
Mukherjee did his MBBS from Patna Medical College in 1957. He started practising in Ranchi in 1966.

Career
Mukherjee was the former head of the Department of Pathology at Rajendra Medical College. He has been treating patients over 55 years. He takes only 5 rupees to treat poor people.

Awards
Padma Shri

References

Living people
Recipients of the Padma Shri in medicine
Year of birth missing (living people)
Medical doctors from Bihar